Matthew Letscher is an American actor, director and playwright, known for his roles as Captain Harrison Love in the 1998 American swashbuckler film The Mask of Zorro and as Colonel Adelbert Ames in the 2003 American film Gods and Generals. He co-starred in the 2016 Michael Bay film 13 Hours: The Secret Soldiers of Benghazi, playing Ambassador J. Christopher Stevens. He has also portrayed Eobard Thawne / Reverse-Flash in The Flash and Legends of Tomorrow.

Personal life
Letscher attended college at the University of Michigan in Ann Arbor, Michigan, where he was a member of the Sigma Nu fraternity and a drama major. He is married to Jennifer, with two children.

Acting
Letscher got his first professional acting job with a role in The Tropic Pickle, during the second season of Jeff Daniels' Purple Rose Theatre Company in Chelsea, Michigan. Letscher impressed Daniels enough that the veteran arranged a meeting for Letscher with Ron Maxwell, the director of Gettysburg. After appearing in a small role, Letscher took advice from Daniels and moved to Los Angeles. He quickly found work in guest roles on television.

In 1995, Letscher was cast as the naive television writer in the Nancy Travis sitcom Almost Perfect, which lasted for a season and a half. He went on to appear as series regular in Living in Captivity in 1998.  The same year, he appeared in the film The Mask of Zorro as the villain Captain Harrison Love. He appeared in the miniseries Jackie, Ethel, Joan: Women of Camelot and in the television films King of Texas, The Beach Boys: An American Family, When Billie Beat Bobby, and Stolen Innocence. He also reunited with Daniels in Gods and Generals (the prequel of Gettysburg) and Daniels' directorial effort Super Sucker. Letscher also returned to The Purple Rose Theatre in the world premiere of Landford Wilson's play Rain Dance.

In 2002, the comedy pilot Good Morning, Miami was picked up by NBC as part of Must See TV Thursday comedy block, but Burke Moses was replaced by Letscher and a second pilot had to be filmed. The romantic comedy sitcom featured Letscher as a smarmy former network anchor who was the primary romantic rival to main character Jake Silver (Mark Feuerstein) for the affection of Dylan (Ashley Williams). Despite the series receiving negative reviews, Letscher and Constance Zimmer were standouts in the series and eventually paired up as a combative couple. But the show was canceled midway though its second season due to low ratings.

His performance in Good Morning, Miami led to him being cast in the lead in the film Straight-Jacket, opposite Carrie Preston, about a gay Hollywood actor forced to marry a beard in the 1950s.  His flair for classical farce also led to him being cast in the leading role of Capt. Jack Absolute in the Lincoln Center theater production of Richard Brinsley Sheridan's The Rivals.  Letscher was praised for his spirited performance and his costar Robert Easton referred to Letscher as "a perfect classical actor."

Letscher was in the cast of Joey, and had a recurring role on The New Adventures of Old Christine and numerous guest starring roles. After appearing as a kind neighbor in Alan Ball's Towelhead, Letscher was cast in Eli Stone, as Nathan Stone, the prophet's kind-hearted older brother.  Despite low ratings, the dramedy series had loyal fans and critical acclaim, earning it a second season which included a larger role for Letscher. His work on Greg Berlanti's Eli Stone lead to his arc on Berlanti's Brothers & Sisters as a love interest for the married Kitty Walker.

In 2012, Letscher starred in the series Bent and Scandal, and was cast in the series The Carrie Diaries as Tom Bradshaw, Carrie Bradshaw's widowed father. The show ran for two seasons from 2013 until 2014. He appeared in the 2013 films, Atom Egoyan's Devil's Knot (about The West Memphis Three) and Spike Jonze's comedy Her, opposite Amy Adams. Since 2015, Letscher has been portraying Eobard Thawne / Reverse-Flash, initially in a recurring role on The Flash and reprised his role as a series regular in season two of Legends of Tomorrow, and reprised the role in two episodes of its seventh season.

Writing
In June 2007, Jeff Daniels' Purple Rose Theatre Company in Chelsea, Michigan, staged the world premiere of Letscher's original play Sea of Fools, a farce set in Joseph McCarthy-era Hollywood. Film director Elia Kazan is a character in the play. Daniels initially planned to direct the play but pulled out, allowing Letscher to also direct the play.

In 2009, his play Gaps in the Fossil Record was staged at the Pacific Resident Theater, then had its world premiere production at the Purple Rose Theatre in 2016.

In 2010, he co-wrote (with Nipper Knapp and Andrew Newberg) and starred in the comedy pilot Gentrification, which won best writing at the Comedy Central New York Television Festival.

Filmography

Theater

References

External links
 
 
 
 Matt Letscher interview with Super Hero Speak

1970 births
20th-century American male actors
21st-century American male actors
21st-century American dramatists and playwrights
American male film actors
American male stage actors
American male television actors
Living people
Male actors from Michigan
People from Grosse Pointe, Michigan
University of Michigan School of Music, Theatre & Dance alumni